The Dubna is a river in eastern Latvia and a right-hand tributary of the Daugava. It joins the Daugava in the town of Līvāni.

Largest tributaries 
 Feimanka (72 km) 
 Ūša (62 km) 
 Kolupe (32 km) 
 Jaša (28 km)

Largest populated areas on river coast 
 Špoģi 
 Vecvārkava 
 Rožupe
 Līvāni

See also 
 List of rivers of Latvia

References 

Rivers of Latvia